Leonidas Bernard "Lee" Young II (November 9, 1954 – January 16, 2016) was an American Baptist minister who served on the Richmond, Virginia City Council from 1992 to 1999, when he was forced to resign for influence peddling. He served as the city's mayor from 1994 to 1996.

Career
Young was the founder and pastor of New Kingdom Ministries in Richmond. He had previously served as minister of the city's Fourth Baptist Church, which he was convicted of defrauding in 1998. He died at the age of 61 in 2016.

House of Delegates attempts

1997
Young entered the Democratic primary in 1997 to succeed Jean Wooden Cunningham as the delegate for Virginia's 71st House district. He lost the nomination to Viola Baskerville, who went on to win the general election by a significant margin.

2015
On March 16, 2015, Young announced his intention to make a political comeback and run for disgraced Delegate Joseph D. Morrissey's seat, representing the state's 74th district.

References

Richmond, Virginia City Council members
Mayors of Richmond, Virginia
2016 deaths
1956 births
Virginia Democrats
Baptist ministers from the United States
Virginia Union University alumni
Drew University alumni
Baptists from Virginia
African-American mayors in Virginia
20th-century African-American people
21st-century African-American people